Bridges Street Market is located at No. 2 Bridges Street, at the corner of Shing Wong Street, in Sheung Wan, Hong Kong. It is a Bauhaus style market building, originally opened in 1953, and scheduled to be renovated and open in 2018 as a news museum.

History
Bridges Street Market was partly built on the site of the former American Congregational Mission Preaching House at which Dr. Sun Yat-Sen was baptised into Christianity in 1883.

Conservation
Bridges Street Market is part of the Central and Western Heritage Trail and the Dr Sun Yat-sen Historical Trail. It was listed as a Grade III historic building in 2011.

See also
 Hong Kong News-Expo

References

Sheung Wan
Retail markets in Hong Kong
Grade III historic buildings in Hong Kong